Faicel (or Faycal) Jaballah (born 1 May 1988 in Nefta, Tunisia) is a Tunisian judoka. He is 1,96 m tall and weighs 130 kg.

Achievements
At the 2011 All-Africa Games in Maputo, Faicel won a gold medal in +100 kg category.

Faicel competed at the 2012 Summer Olympics in the +100 kg event, he defeated Yerzhan Shynkeyev before being eliminated by the 2011 world champion Teddy Riner.

Faicel qualified for the 2013 World Judo Championships in Rio. He competed in the +100kg division, and defeated Roy Meyer and Islam El Shehaby before being defeated by Andreas Tölzer in the final match of the pool B.  In the repechage, Faicel defeated Ryu Shichinohe and advanced to face Adam Okruashvili for the third place in +100 kg category. He finished the competition in the third place, along with Andreas Tölzer.  This result was the best achievement in his career so far.

At the 2016 Olympics, he lost his first match to Barna Bor.

At the 2021 African Judo Championships held in Dakar, Senegal, he won the gold medal in his event.

References

External links
 
 
 

1988 births
Living people
Tunisian male judoka
Olympic judoka of Tunisia
Judoka at the 2012 Summer Olympics
Judoka at the 2016 Summer Olympics
People from Tozeur
Mediterranean Games bronze medalists for Tunisia
Competitors at the 2013 Mediterranean Games
African Games gold medalists for Tunisia
African Games medalists in judo
Mediterranean Games medalists in judo
Competitors at the 2011 All-Africa Games
Competitors at the 2019 African Games
Competitors at the 2018 Mediterranean Games
21st-century Tunisian people